James David Lofton (born July 5, 1956) is an American former professional football player and coach.  
He played in the National Football League (NFL) as a wide receiver for the Green Bay Packers (1978–1986), Los Angeles Raiders (1987–1988), the Buffalo Bills (1989–1992), Los Angeles Rams (1993) and Philadelphia Eagles (1993).  He was also the NCAA champion in the long jump in 1978 while attending Stanford University.

Widely regarded as one of the greatest wide receivers of all time, Lofton was inducted into the Pro Football Hall of Fame in 2003. After his playing career ended, he became a wide receivers coach for the San Diego Chargers and Oakland Raiders.

High school career
Lofton prepped at George Washington High School in Los Angeles, California where he played quarterback and safety.

College career
Lofton played college football at Stanford University.  As a senior in 1977, he received 57 passes for 1,010 yards (17.72 yards per reception average) with 14 touchdowns, and was an AP & NEA second-team All-American selection. Lofton was a member of Theta Delta Chi fraternity, and earned a bachelor's degree in industrial engineering in 1978.

Track and field
Lofton won the long jump at the 1978 NCAA Track and Field Championships with a wind-aided jump of 26 feet 11¾ inches. He won the long jump at the 1974 CIF California State Meet with a jump of 24 feet 3½ inches after placing sixth in this meet the year before. He was also a sprinter of note, with a best of 20.5 in the 200 meter. He has been an active participant in Masters track and field since 1997.

Professional career
Lofton was drafted in the first round (sixth overall) of the 1978 NFL Draft by the Green Bay Packers.  He was named to the NFL Pro Bowl eight times (seven with the Packers, one with the Bills).  He was also named to four All-Pro teams.  He also played in three Super Bowls during his career with the Bills.  Lofton was inducted into the Pro Football Hall of Fame in 2003.

In his 16 NFL seasons, Lofton caught 764 passes for 14,004 yards and 75 touchdowns.  He averaged 20 yards per catch or more in five seasons, leading the league in 1983 and 1984 with an average of 22.4 and 22 yards respectively.  He also rushed 32 times for 246 yards and one touchdown.

Lofton is the first NFL player to record 14,000 yards receiving and was the second (one game after Drew Hill) to score a touchdown in the 1970s, 1980s, and 1990s.  During his nine seasons in Green Bay, Lofton played in seven Pro Bowls and left as the team's all-time leading receiver with 9,656 yards (since broken by Donald Driver). On the retirement of Steve Largent, Lofton became the NFL's active leader in receiving yards at the start of 1990, through to his retirement in 1993. In 1991, Lofton became the oldest player to record 1,000 receiving yards in a season (since broken by Jerry Rice). On October 21, of that same year, Lofton became the oldest player to record 200 yards receiving as well as 200 yards from scrimmage in a game (35 years, 108 days). He is also the 2nd oldest player to have 200+ all-purpose yards in a game behind Mel Gray, (35 years, 204 days).

Coaching career
Lofton became the wide receiver coach for the San Diego Chargers in 2002 and continued that role until he was fired on January 22, 2008. Early in his coaching career, Lofton watched Robert Woods in a high school track meet, he noted that he would be an incredible NFL prospect.  In 2005 at the NFL draft, Lofton played catch with Desean Jackson, noting he was going to be an excellent deep ball threat. Lofton was later announced as a candidate to become head coach for Oakland Raiders in 2007 but the job would later go to Lane Kiffin.  In 2008, the Raiders hired him as their wide receivers coach. On January 13, 2009, Lofton was let go by the Oakland Raiders and replaced by Sanjay Lal.

Broadcasting career
Lofton served as a color analyst and sideline reporter for NFL coverage on Westwood One radio from 1999–2001. In 2009, he re-joined the network to team with Dave Sims and later Kevin Kugler on Sunday Night Football broadcasts. He moved to a television position on the NFL on CBS in 2017, replacing the departing Solomon Wilcots. He has been the game analyst paired with Andrew Catalon since then.

Personal life
Lofton and his wife Beverly have three children including David who also played college football at Stanford.  Lofton's cousin, Kevin Bass, was a Major League Baseball player.

In October 1984, a dancer at the Marquee Club in Milwaukee accused James Lofton and his Packers teammate Eddie Lee Ivery of sexual assault. Lofton and Ivery asserted that the acts were consensual. Neither player ended up being charged in the incident due to a lack of evidence. Two years later, Lofton was charged with second-degree sexual assault following an incident in the stairwell of a Green Bay nightclub. He was found not guilty of that charge.

References

External links
 
 

1956 births
Living people
African-American coaches of American football
African-American players of American football
American Conference Pro Bowl players
American football wide receivers
Buffalo Bills players
College football announcers
Green Bay Packers players
Los Angeles Raiders players
Los Angeles Rams players
National Conference Pro Bowl players
National Football League announcers
Oakland Raiders coaches
People from Fort Ord, California
Philadelphia Eagles players
Players of American football from Los Angeles
Pro Football Hall of Fame inductees
San Diego Chargers coaches
Coaches of American football from California
Stanford Cardinal football players
Stanford Cardinal men's track and field athletes
Track and field athletes from Los Angeles
American male long jumpers
21st-century African-American people
20th-century African-American sportspeople
Sportspeople from Los Angeles
10,000 receiving yards club